The 2019 Premier Volleyball League Collegiate Conference was the ninth conference of the Premier Volleyball League (36th conference of the former Shakey's V-League). The conference started on August 17, 2019, and ended on October 12, 2019, at the Filoil Flying V Centre, San Juan, Metro Manila, Philippines. Defending champions University of the Philippines skipped this conference, while reigning University Athletic Association of the Philippines champion Ateneo de Manila University returned after sitting out the 2018 collegiate conference.

Participating teams 

Pool – A

Pool – B

Preliminary round

Pool A

|}

Pool B

|}

Match results
All times are in Philippines Standard Time (UTC+08:00)

|}

Final round 

 All series are best-of-three.

Semifinals 
Rank A1 vs rank B2

|}
Rank B1 vs rank A2

|}

Finals 
3rd place

|}
Championships

|}

Awards

Final standings

Players of the week

See also 
 2019 Spikers’ Turf Collegiate Conference

References 

Premier Volleyball League (Philippines)
2019 in Philippine sport